Elon commonly refers to Elon Musk.

Elon may also refer to:

People
 Elon (name), a given name and surname

Places in the United States

 Elon, Iowa, an unincorporated community
 Elon, North Carolina, a town
 Elon, Virginia, an unincorporated community

Other uses
 Elon University, in Elon, North Carolina
 Elon Phoenix, the school's athletic program
 Elon (chemical), Eastman Kodak's trade name for p-methylaminophenol sulfate
 Elon the Muskox, a living sculpture at City Hall in Yellowknife, Northwest Territories, Canada
 Echelon Corporation (NASDAQ code: ELON)

See also
 
 
 Alon (disambiguation)
 Allon (disambiguation)
 Aloni, a surname
 Eilon, Israel